Anser Island lies off the southern tip of Wilsons Promontory in Victoria, Australia.

The island is within Wilsons Promontory National Park. The surrounding waters to the mean high-water mark are within Wilsons Promontory Marine National Park. 
It is part of the Wilsons Promontory Islands Important Bird Area, identified as such by BirdLife International because of its importance for breeding seabirds.

The island was named by Lieutenant H. J. Stanley, who surveyed the islands west and south of Wilsons
Promontory in 1868, probably after the Cape Barren goose (subfamily Anserinae).

References

Islands of Victoria (Australia)
Wilsons Promontory
Important Bird Areas of Victoria (Australia)